Trechus winkleri is a species of ground beetle in the subfamily Trechinae. It was described by Jeannel in 1927.

References

winkleri
Beetles described in 1927